Khram is the eighth full-length album by the Russian pagan metal band Arkona. It was released on 19 January 2018 through Napalm Records. The title means "Temple" in English.

Reception

Metal Hammer Germany's reviewer wrote that Arkona continued with the same intensity that was known from their previous albums. Influences of Black metal and "unusual melodies" were, however, noted in this release. According to the Sonic Seducer, the album shows the natural development of the band in terms of vocals, composition and instrumentation. Thematically, it constitutes a "tribute to the ... worship of flora and fauna". A review by Teamrock called Khram "wildly adventurous" and noted Arkona's sincere expression of their pagan ideals.

Track listing

References

2018 albums
Arkona (band) albums
Napalm Records albums